Joseph  or Joe Oliver may refer to:

 Joseph Oliver (politician) (1852–1922), Canadian politician, mayor of Toronto in 1908 and 1909
 Joseph D. Oliver, American businessman
 Joe Oliver (baseball) (born 1965), American former professional baseball player
 Joe Oliver (cricketer) (born 1946), English former cricketer
 Joe Oliver (politician) (born 1940), Canadian former politician and Minister of Finance
 Joe Oliver (rugby league) (fl. 1920–1940), English rugby league footballer of the 1920s, 1930s and 1940s
 King Oliver (Joseph Nathan Oliver, 1885–1938), American bandleader and jazz musician

See also
Joseph Olivier (disambiguation)